Donglei "Emma" Fan is an associate professor of Mechanical Engineering of the Cockrell School of Engineering at The University of Texas at Austin and the principal investigator in its Nanomaterials Innovation Lab. In 2014, her team built a nanomotor that was significantly smaller, faster, and longer running than any previously designed. The techniques that they developed have been referred to as a "breakthrough technology". 
The achievement was noted as a highlight of 2014 in Science Year by Year (2017).

Early life and education
Fan attended Nanjing University (NJU) as part of an honor program for gifted youth, the Department of Intensive Instruction, as an early admitted student, waived the National College Entrance Exam and awarded the Freshman Merit Scholarship. She received her bachelor's degree in chemistry from NJU in 1999.

She then attended Johns Hopkins University (JHU), from which she received two master's degrees, in materials science and engineering (2003) and in electrical engineering (2005). She went on to receive her Doctor of Philosophy degree in materials science and engineering from JHU in 2007. She was a postdoctoral fellow at JHU from 2007 to 2009.

Career
In 2010, Fan joined The University of Texas at Austin as an assistant professor in the Department of Mechanical Engineering.
She is the principal investigator in its Nanomaterial Innovation Lab.
In 2012, Fan received the prestigious National Science Foundation (NSF) CAREER Award.  
In 2013, Fan was one of sixty engineers from Europe and the United States who were invited to participate in the EU-US Frontier of Engineering Symposium in France, supported by the National Academy of Engineering (NAE). 
In 2014, Fan was selected to participate in the Arab-American Frontiers of Science, Engineering, and Medicine Symposium, organized by the National Academy of Sciences (NAS).
In 2016, Fan was promoted to associate professor with tenure.
In 2017, Fan received a Robert & Jane Mitchell Endowed Faculty Fellowship in Engineering.

Donglei Fan is on the editorial board of the Scientific Reports.

Research
Donglei Fan studies nanoelectromechanical systems (NEMS), in particular the design, assembly and control of rotary NEMS or nanomotors.
She and her coworkers have identified fundamental interactions at the nanoscale level and developed novel mechanisms for manipulating nanoscale components to create and control nanomotors. 
The techniques developed have been described as a "breakthrough technology".

While at Johns Hopkins University, she helped to develop a technique for moving and positioning nanosctructures using alternating and constant electric fields. Applied using lithographically patterned electrodes, the orientation of the nanowire is controlled by the alternating fields while the direction of translation is controlled by the constant fields. The technique has been referred to as "electric tweezers".
At the University of Texas at Austin, Fan has used this approach to move components and construct and manipulate nanomotors.

Fan's approach has enabled her team to design and build nanomotors that are substantially smaller, faster, and longer lasting than previous nanomotors. 
In Nature Communications  (2014), they describe the bottom-up assembly of arrays of nanomotors. Each nanomotor consists of only three parts: a quadrupole microelectrode for a stator, a nanomagnet for a bearing, and a nanowire for a rotor.

The resulting nanomotor is less than 1 micrometer in all dimensions, making it 1/500th the size of a grain of table salt. Significantly, it is small enough to fit inside a human cell.
It is able to spin at much higher speeds than previous nanomotors. It can run at speeds up to 18,000 rpm, comparable to the rate of a jet engine. The duration of rotation such nanomotor is as long as 15 hours. With a titanium nanobearing, one can run for as long as 80 hours with a total 1.1 million rotation cycles. Previous nanomotors could run at 500 rpm or less for seconds or minutes.

The speed and direction of the nanomotor's movement through liquid can be controlled using electric tweezers.
Experimenters were able to turn the nanomotors on and off and cause their rotation to occur in either a clockwise or counterclockwise direction. They were able to arrange the nanomotors in a pattern and direct their movements in a synchronized way. Raman spectroscopy can be used to quantitatively monitor the placement of the nanomotors and their rate of rotation in real-time.

Fan's nanomotor is the first to be capable of releasing a drug from its surface at a controllable rate. 
The surface of the rotor can be coated with a biochemical, which will be released in accordance with fluid boundary layer theory as the rotor spins.  As the rotor moves faster, more of the biochemical is released, 
Potential applications as a controllable drug delivery mechanism include moving through the body to deliver insulin in diabetes, and attacking individual cancer cells.

Fan has applied for a number of patents relating to this technology, several of which have been granted.

Fan is also involved in studying microscale step-motors, chemical sensing, control of energy transfer in quantum dots using Förster resonance energy transfer, and three dimensional nanoporous materials.

Awards and honors
 2017, Robert & Jane Mitchell Endowed Faculty Fellowship in Engineering
 2014, Ranked third of ten "discoveries that will shape the future", BBC Focus magazine, British Broadcasting Corporation, for her work on bottom-up assembly of inorganic nanomotors 
 2012, National Science Foundation CAREER Awards, National Science Foundation
 one of 24 finalists for the Beckman Young Investigators Award

References 

Living people
Nanjing University alumni
Johns Hopkins University alumni
University of Texas at Austin faculty
Year of birth missing (living people)